McAuley High School was an all-girls Catholic high school in Toledo, Ohio.  It was named for Catherine McAuley, the founder of the Sisters of Mercy.  It began classes in 1958 and was one of three all-girls Catholic high schools in the city, the other two being Notre Dame Academy and St. Ursula Academy.

The McAuley Lions were members of the Toledo City League and joined .  Girls' sports competition between schools had begun in the early 1970s for Toledo high schools.

Due to financial problems and low enrollment, McAuley closed its doors at the end of the 1987–88 school year.  They intended to have 1,000 students annually, but had a peak of 551 during the 1969–70 school year.  In 1988, Toledo Christian Schools bought and moved into the McAuley building, which has remained a Pre-K to 12th grade Christian faith-based school ever since.

References

External links
TCS History
City League Track History
McAuley High to Close, Sept 26, 1987

Defunct schools in Ohio
Defunct Catholic secondary schools in Ohio
High schools in Toledo, Ohio
Educational institutions established in 1955
Educational institutions disestablished in 1988
1955 establishments in Ohio
1988 disestablishments in Ohio